Side of the road may refer to:
 Driving on the left or right
 Shoulder (road), a reserved area alongside the verge of a road or motorway
 Sidewalk, also known as a pavement or footpath

See also 
 "Bright Side of the Road", song by Van Morrison
 Wrong Side of the Road, a low-budget film made in South Australia in 1980